The foreign relations of North Korea – officially the Democratic People's Republic of Korea (DPRK) – have been shaped by its conflict with South Korea and its historical ties with world communism. Both the government of North Korea and the government of South Korea (officially the Republic of Korea) claim to be the sole legitimate government of the whole of Korea. The Korean War in the 1950s failed to resolve the issue, leaving North Korea locked in a military confrontation with South Korea and the United States Forces Korea across the Demilitarized Zone.

At the start of the Cold War, North Korea only had diplomatic recognition by communist countries. Over the following decades, it established relations with developing countries and joined the Non-Aligned Movement. When the Eastern Bloc collapsed in the years 1989–1992, North Korea made efforts to improve its diplomatic relations with developed capitalist countries. At the same time, there were international efforts to resolve the confrontation on the Korean peninsula (known as the Korean conflict). At the same time, North Korea acquired nuclear weapons, adding to the concerns of the international community.

In 2018, North Korean leader Kim Jong-un began negotiations with South Korea and the United States. This led to the first face-to-face discussion in Singapore between a leader of North Korea and a sitting President of the United States.

Principles and practice 
The Constitution of North Korea establishes the country's foreign policy. While Article 2 of the constitution describes the country as a "revolutionary state", Article 9 says that the country will work to achieve Korean reunification, maintain state sovereignty and political independence, and "national unity".

Many articles specifically outline the country's foreign policy. Article 15 says that the country will "protect the democratic national rights of Korean compatriots overseas and their legitimate rights and interests as recognized by international law" and Article 17 explicates the basic ideals of the country's foreign policy:
 Basic ideals of their foreign policy are "independence, peace and friendship"
 Establishment of political, economic, cultural, and diplomatic relations with "friendly countries" on the principles of "complete equality, independence, mutual respect, non-interference in each other's affairs and mutual benefit."
 Unifying with "peoples of the world who defend their independence"
 Actively supporting and encouraging "struggle of all people who oppose all forms of aggression and interference and fight for their countries' independence and national and class emancipation."

Other parts of the constitution explicate other foreign policies. Article 36 says that foreign trade by the DPRK will be conducted "by state organs, enterprises, and social, cooperative organizations" while the country will "develop foreign trade on the principles of complete equality and mutual benefit." Article 37 adds that the country will encourage "institutions, enterprises and organizations in the country to conduct equity or contractual joint ventures with foreign corporations and individuals, and to establish and operate enterprises of various kinds in special economic zones." Furthermore, Article 38 says that the DPRK will implement a protectionist tariff policy "to protect the independent national economy" while Article 59 says the country's armed forces will "carry out the military-first revolutionary line." In terms of other foreign policy, Article 80 says that the country will grant asylum to foreign nationals who have been persecuted "for struggling for peace and democracy, national independence and socialism or for the freedom of scientific and cultural pursuits."

Ultimately, however, as explicated in Articles 100–103 and 109, the chairman of the National Defense Commission (NDC) is the supreme leader of the country, with a term that is the same as members of the Supreme People's Assembly or SPA (five years),  as is established in article 90, directing the country's armed forces, and guiding overall state affairs, but is not determined by him alone since he is still accountable to the SPA. Rather, the NDC chairman works to defend the state from external actors. Currently, Kim Jong-un is the General Secretary of the Workers' Party of Korea (WPK), President of state affairs, and holder of numerous other leadership positions. The Constitution also delineates, in article 117, that the President of SPA Presidium, which can convene this assembly, represents the state and receives "credentials and letters of recall from envoys accredited by other countries." Additionally, the cabinet of the DPRK has the authority to "conclude treaties with foreign countries and conduct external affairs" as noted in Article 125.

North Korea is one of the few countries in which the giving of presents still plays a significant role in diplomatic protocol, with Korean Central News Agency (KCNA) reporting from time to time the country's leader received a floral basket or other gift from a foreign leader or organization. During a 2000 visit to Pyongyang, US Secretary of State Madeleine Albright gave North Korean leader Kim Jong-il a basketball signed by Michael Jordan, as he took an interest in NBA basketball. During the 2000 inter-Korean summit, Kim Jong-il made a gift of two Pungsan dogs (associated with the North) to South Korean president Kim Dae-jung. In return, Kim Dae-jung gave two Jindo dogs (associated with the South) to Kim Jong-il. At their Pyongyang summit in 2018, North Korean leader Kim Jong-un gave two Pungsan dogs to South Korean President, Moon Jae-in.

North Korea takes its defense seriously, confronting countries they see as threatening their sovereignty, and restricts the activities of foreign diplomats.

History

After 1945, the USSR supplied the economic and military aid that enabled North Korea to mount its invasion of South Korea in 1950. Soviet aid and influence continued at a high level during the Korean war. This was only the beginning of North Korea as governed by the faction which had its roots in an anti-Japanese Korean nationalist movement based in Manchuria and China, with Kim Il-sung participating in this movement and later forming the Workers' Party of Korea (WPK).

The assistance of Chinese troops, after 1950, during the war and their presence in the country until 1958 gave China some degree of influence in North Korea.

In 1961, North Korea concluded formal mutual security treaties with the Soviet Union and China, which have not been formally ended. In the case of China, Kim Il-sung and Chou En-Lai signed the Sino-North Korean Mutual Aid and Cooperation Friendship Treaty, whereby Communist China pledged to immediately render military and other assistance by all means to its ally against any outside attack. The treaty says, in short that:

The Chairman of the People's Republic of China and the Presidium of the Supreme People's Assembly of the Democratic People's Republic of Korea, determined, in accordance with Marxism–Leninism and the principle of proletarian internationalism and on the basis of mutual respect for state sovereignty and territorial integrity, mutual non-aggression, non-interference in each other's internal affairs, equality and mutual benefit, and mutual assistance and support, to make every effort to further strengthen and develop the fraternal relations of friendship, co-operation and mutual assistance between the People's Republic of China and the Democratic People's Republic of Korea, to jointly guard the security of the two peoples, and to safeguard and consolidate the peace of Asia and the world ... [Article II:]The Contracting Parties will continue to make every effort to safeguard the peace of Asia and the world and the security of all peoples ... [Article II:] In the event of one of the Contracting Parties being subjected to the armed attack by any state or several states jointly and thus being involved in a state of war, the other Contracting Party shall immediately render military and other assistance by all means at its disposal ... [Article V:] The Contracting Parties, on the principles of mutual respect for sovereignty, non-interference in each other's internal affairs, equality and mutual benefit and in the spirit of friendly co-operation, will continue to render each other every possible economic and technical aid in the cause of socialist construction of the two countries and will continue to consolidate and develop economic, cultural, and scientific and technical co-operation between the two countries ... [Article VI:] The Contracting Parties hold that the unification of Korea must be realized along peaceful and democratic lines and that such a solution accords exactly with the national interests of the Korean people and the aim of preserving peace in the Far East.

For most of the Cold War, North Korea avoided taking sides in the Sino-Soviet split. It was originally only recognized by countries in the Communist Bloc until 1962 when, upon becoming independent Algeria recognized it (the provisional government set up by Algerian independence fighters had made a resolution to recognize North Korea).

East Germany was an important source of economic cooperation for North Korea. The East German leader, Erich Honecker, who visited in 1977, was one of Kim Il-sung's closest foreign friends. In 1986, the two countries signed an agreement on military co-operation. Kim was also close to maverick Communist leaders, Josip Broz Tito of Yugoslavia, and Nicolae Ceaușescu of Romania. North Korea began to play a part in the global radical movement, forging ties with such diverse groups as the Black Panther Party of the US, the Workers' Party of Ireland, and the African National Congress. As it increasingly emphasized its independence, North Korea began to promote the doctrine of Juche ("self-reliance") as an alternative to orthodox Marxism-Leninism and as a model for developing countries to follow.

When North-South dialogue started in 1972, North Korea began to receive diplomatic recognition from countries outside the Communist bloc. Within four years, North Korea was recognized by 93 countries, on par with South Korea's 96. North Korea gained entry into the World Health Organization and, as a result, sent its first permanent observer missions to the United Nations (UN). In 1975, it joined the Non-Aligned Movement.

Libyan Leader Muammar Gaddafi met with Kim Il Sung and was a close ally of the DPRK.

In 1983 North Korea carried out the Rangoon bombing, a failed assassination attempt against South Korean dictator Chun Doo-hwan while he was visiting Burma. This attack on neutral soil led many Third World countries to reconsider their ties with North Korea. During the 1980s, the pace of North Korea's establishment of new diplomatic relations slowed considerably. Following Kim Il-sung's 1984 visit to Moscow, there was a dramatic improvement in Soviet-DPRK relations, resulting in renewed deliveries of advanced Soviet weaponry to North Korea and increases in economic aid. In 1989, as a response to the 1988 Seoul Olympics, North Korea hosted the 13th World Festival of Youth and Students in Pyongyang.

South Korea established diplomatic relations with the Soviet Union in 1990 and the People's Republic of China in 1992, which put a serious strain on relations between North Korea and its traditional allies. Moreover, the demise of Communist states in Eastern Europe in 1989 and the disintegration of the Soviet Union in 1991 had resulted in a significant drop in communist aid to North Korea, resulting in largely decreased relations with Russia. Subsequently, South Korea developed the "sunshine policy" towards North Korea, aiming for peaceful Korean reunification. This policy ended in 2009.

In September 1991, North Korea became a member of the UN. In July 2000, it began participating in the ASEAN Regional Forum (ARF), as Foreign Minister Paek Nam-sun attended the ARF ministerial meeting in Bangkok July 26–27. North Korea also expanded its bilateral diplomatic ties in that year, establishing diplomatic relations with Italy, Australia and the Philippines. The United Kingdom established diplomatic relations with North Korea on December 13, 2000, as did Canada in February 2001, followed by Germany and New Zealand on March 1, 2001.

 	
In 2006, North Korea test-fired a series of ballistic missiles, after Chinese officials had advised North Korean authorities not to do so. As a result, Chinese authorities publicly rebuked what the west perceives as China's closest ally, and supported the UN Security Council Resolution 1718, which imposed sanctions on North Korea. At other times however, China has blocked United Nations resolutions threatening sanctions against North Korea. In January 2009, China's paramount leader Hu Jintao and North Korea's supreme leader Kim Jong-il exchanged greetings and declared 2009 as the "year of China-DPRK friendship", marking 60 years of diplomatic relations between the two countries.

On November 28, 2010, as part of the United States diplomatic cables leak, WikiLeaks and media partners such as The Guardian published details of communications in which Chinese officials referred to North Korea as a "spoiled child" and its nuclear program as "a threat to the whole world's security" while two anonymous Chinese officials claimed there was growing support in Beijing for Korean reunification under the South's government.

In 2017, North Korea tested the Hwasong-15, an intercontinental ballistic missile capable of striking anywhere in the USA.  Estimates of North Korea's nuclear arsenal at that time ranged between 15 and 60 bombs, probably including hydrogen bombs.

In February 2018, North Korea sent a high-level delegation to the Winter Olympics in South Korea. Subsequently, Kim Jong-un met with President Moon Jae-in of South Korea and US President Donald Trump to discuss peace.

Inter-Korean relations

In August 1971, both North and South Korea agreed to hold talks through their respective Red Cross societies with the aim of reuniting the many Korean families separated following the division of Korea after the Korean War. After a series of secret meetings, both sides announced on July 4, 1972, an agreement to work toward peaceful reunification and an end to the hostile atmosphere prevailing on the peninsula. Dialogue was renewed on several fronts in September 1984, when South Korea accepted the North's offer to provide relief goods to victims of severe flooding in South Korea.

In a major initiative in July 1988, South Korean President Roh Tae-woo called for new efforts to promote north–south exchanges, family reunification, inter-Korean trade and contact in international forums. Roh followed up this initiative in a UN General Assembly speech in which South Korea offered to discuss security matters with the North for the first time. In September 1990, the first of eight prime minister-level meetings between officials of North Korea and South Korea took place in Seoul, beginning an especially fruitful period of dialogue. The prime ministerial talks resulted in two major agreements: the Agreement on Reconciliation, Nonaggression, Exchanges, and Cooperation (the Basic Agreement) and the Declaration on the Denuclearization of the Korean Peninsula (the Joint Declaration). The Joint Declaration on denuclearization was initiated on December 13, 1991. It forbade both sides to test, manufacture, produce, receive, possess, store, deploy, or use nuclear weapons and forbade the possession of nuclear reprocessing and uranium enrichment facilities. On January 30, 1992, North Korea also signed a nuclear safeguards agreement with the IAEA, as it had pledged to do in 1985 when acceding to the nuclear Non-Proliferation Treaty. This safeguards agreement allowed IAEA inspections to begin in June 1992.

As the 1990s progressed, concern over the North's nuclear program became a major issue in north–south relations and between North Korea and the US. By 1998, South Korean President Kim Dae-jung announced a Sunshine Policy towards North Korea. This led in June 2000 to the first Inter-Korean summit, between Kim Dae-jung and Kim Jong-il. In September 2000, the North and South Korean teams marched together at the Sydney Olympics. Trade increased to the point where South Korea became North Korea's largest trading partner. Starting in 1998, the Mount Kumgang Tourist Region was developed as a joint venture between the government of North Korea and Hyundai. In 2003, the Kaesong Industrial Region was established to allow South Korean businesses to invest in the North.

In 2007, South Korean President Roh Moo-hyun held talks with Kim Jong-il in Pyongyang. On October 4, 2007, South Korean President Roh and Kim signed a peace declaration. The document called for international talks to replace the Armistice which ended the Korean War with a permanent peace treaty. The Sunshine Policy was formally abandoned by subsequent South Korean President Lee Myung-bak in 2010.

The Kaesong Industrial Park was closed in 2013, amid tensions about North Korea's nuclear weapons program. It reopened the same year but closed again in 2016.

In 2017 Moon Jae-in was elected President of South Korea with promises to return to the Sunshine Policy. In his New Year address for 2018, North Korean leader Kim Jong-un proposed sending a delegation to the upcoming Winter Olympics in South Korea. The Seoul–Pyongyang hotline was reopened after almost two years. North and South Korea marched together in the Olympics opening ceremony and fielded a united women's ice hockey team. North Korea sent an unprecedented high-level delegation, headed by Kim Yo-jong, sister of Kim Jong-un, and President Kim Yong-nam, as well as athletes and performers.

On April 27, the 2018 inter-Korean summit took place between President Moon Jae-in and Kim Jong-un on the South Korean side of the Joint Security Area. It was also the first time since the Korean War that a North Korean leader had entered South Korean territory.  The summit ended with both countries pledging to work towards complete denuclearization of the Korean Peninsula. They agreed to work to remove all nuclear weapons from the Korean Peninsula and, within the year, to declare an official end to the Korean War. As part of the Panmunjom Declaration which was signed by leaders of both countries, both sides also called for the end of longstanding military activities in the region of the Korean border and a reunification of Korea. Also, the leaders of the region's two divided states have agreed to work together to connect and modernise their border railways.

Moon and Kim met the second time on May 26.  Their second summit was unannounced, held in the North Korean portion of Joint Security Area and concerned Kim's upcoming summit with US President Donald Trump. Trump and Kim met on June 12, 2018, in Singapore and endorsed the Panmunjom Declaration. On June 30, 2019, Kim and Moon met again at the Korean DMZ, this time joined by Trump. During 2019, North Korea conducted a series of short–range missile tests, while the US and South Korea took part in joint military drills in August. On August 16, 2019, North Korea's ruling party made a statement criticizing the South for participating in the drills and for buying US military hardware, calling it a "grave provocation" and saying there would be no more negotiation.

On June 16, 2020, the joint liaison office in Kaesong was blown up by the North Korean government.

Nuclear weapons program

North Korea's nuclear research program started with Soviet help in the 1960s, on condition that it joined the Nuclear Non-Proliferation Treaty (NPT). In the 1980s an indigenous nuclear reactor development program started with a small experimental 5 MWe gas-cooled reactor in Yongbyon, with a 50 MWe and 200 MWe reactor to follow. Concerns that North Korea had non-civilian nuclear ambitions were first raised in the late 1980s and almost resulted in their withdrawal from the NPT in 1994. However, the Agreed Framework and the Korean Peninsula Energy Development Organization (KEDO) temporarily resolved this crisis by having the US and several other countries agree that in exchange for dismantling its nuclear program, two light-water reactors (LWRs) would be provided with moves toward normalization of political and economic relations. This agreement started to break down from 2001 because of slow progress on the KEDO light water reactor project and U.S. President George W. Bush's Axis of Evil speech. After continued allegations from the United States, North Korea declared the existence of uranium enrichment programs during a private meeting with American military officials. North Korea withdrew from the Nuclear Non-Proliferation Treaty on January 10, 2003. In 2006, North Korea conducted its first nuclear test.

In the third (and last) phase of the fifth round of six-party talks were held on February 8, 2007, and implementation of the agreement reached at the end of the round has been successful according to the requirements of steps to be taken by all six parties within 30 days, and within 60 days after the agreement, including normalization of US-North Korea and Japanese-North Korean diplomatic ties,  but on the condition that North Korea ceases to operate its Yongbyon nuclear research centre.

North Korea conducted further nuclear tests in 2009, 2013, January and September 2016, and 2017. In 2018, North Korea ceased conducting nuclear and intercontinental ballistic missile tests. Kim Jong-un signed the Panmunjom Declaration committing to "denuclearisation of the Korean Peninsula" and affirmed the same commitment in a subsequent meeting with US President Donald Trump.

Bilateral relations 
North Korea is often perceived as the "Hermit kingdom", completely isolated from the rest of the world, but North Korea maintains diplomatic relations with 164 independent states.

The country also has bilateral relations with the State of Palestine, the Sahrawi Arab Democratic Republic, and the European Union.

Africa

Americas

Asia

Europe

Oceania

International organizations
North Korea is a member of the following international organizations:

 Animal Production and Health Commission for Asia and the Pacific
 Asia and Pacific Plant Protection Commission
 Asia-Pacific Broadcasting Union
 Asia/Pacific Group on Money Laundering (observer)
 Asia-Pacific Telecommunity
 Asian–African Legal Consultative Organization
 ASEAN Regional Forum
 Asia-Europe Meeting
 Bureau International des Expositions
 Centre for Agriculture and Bioscience International
 Codex Alimentarius Commission
 Common Fund for Commodities
 Conference on Disarmament
 Convention on Biological Diversity
 Federation Internationale de Football Association (FIFA)
 Food and Agriculture Organization of the United Nations
 Group of 77
 Intergovernmental Oceanographic Commission
 Intergovernmental Organization for Marketing Information and Technical Advisory Services for Fishery Products in the Asian and Pacific Region
 International Bureau of Education
 International Bureau of Weights and Measures
 International Civil Aviation Organization
 International Electrotechnical Commission (associate member)
 International Red Cross and Red Crescent Movement
 International Fund for Agricultural Development
 International Federation of Red Cross and Red Crescent Societies
 International Hydrographic Organization
 International Maritime Organization
 International Mobile Satellite Organization
 International Olympic Committee
 International Organization for Standardization
 International Organization of Legal Metrology (correspondent member)
 International Telecommunications Satellite Organization
 International Telecommunication Union
 International Textile & Clothing Bureau
 Intersputnik International Organization of Space Communications
 Inter-Parliamentary Union
 Joint Institute for Nuclear Research
 Non-Aligned Movement
 Organization for Cooperation of Railways
 Partnerships in Environmental Management for the Seas of East Asia
 Society for Worldwide Interbank Financial Telecommunication
 The South Centre
 United Nations
 United Nations Children's Fund (UNICEF)
 United Nations Conference on Trade and Development
 United Nations Development Fund for Women
 United Nations Development Programme
 United Nations Economic and Social Commission for Asia and the Pacific 
 United Nations Educational, Scientific, and Cultural Organization (UNESCO)
 United Nations Environment Programme
 United Nations Industrial Development Organization
 United Nations Population Fund
 World Tourism Organization
 Universal Postal Union
 World Federation of Trade Unions
 World Food Programme
 World Health Organization
 World Intellectual Property Organization
 World Meteorological Organization
 World Organization for Animal Health

Notable people
 

Pak Tong-chun, diplomat

See also

 Korean Friendship Association
 List of diplomatic missions in North Korea
 Visa requirements for North Korean citizens

Notes

References

Citations

Works cited

Further reading

External links 
 Official website  of the Ministry of Foreign Affairs of North Korea
 North Korea in the World
 North Korea International Documentation Project 
 North Korean Provocative Actions, 1950 – 2007 Congressional Research Service.

 
Isolationism